Global University (GU) is an educational institution at Beirut, Lebanon established in 1992.

Global University currently comprises three faculties:
  	Faculty of Administrative Sciences
  	Faculty of Health Sciences
 	Faculty of Literature and Humanities

Academics
Faculty of Health Sciences

 The faculty offers a bachelor's degree and comprises the following academic departments:
 
	Department of Nursing
 	Department of Nutrition and Dietetics
 	Department of Physical Therapy
 	Department of Medical Lab
 	Department of Prosthetics and Orthotics (to be announced)
 	Department of Biomedical Science

Faculty of Administrative Sciences
 
 The faculty offers a bachelor's degree in the following specializations
 
1- Department of Business Administration

a.	Management
b.	Accounting
c.	Marketing
d.	Human Resources Management
e.	Executive Management
  
2-	Department of Information Technology and Computer Science

a.	Computer Science
b.	Information Technology and Telecommunications
 
3- 	Department of Management Information Systems 
a.	Management Information Systems
 
b.	Health Management Information Systems
 
4-  	Master of Business Administrations (MBA)

5- 	Master of Information Technology and Communications

  
Faculty of Literature and Humanities 
  
 The faculty offers a bachelor's degree in the following specializations

1- 	Department of Education 

a.	English and Social Studies Education
b.	Math Education
c.	Science Education
d.	Math and Science Education
2- 	Department of Arabic Language

3- 	Department of Foreign Languages and Translation

4- 	Teaching Diploma

5- 	Master of Education

Cooperation Agreements
 Global University Joins International Association of Universities(IAU)
 Global Joins SFIPA
 ASONAM 2010
 OSINT_WM 2010
 Global University signs a scientific cooperation agreement with the American University in Greece
 Lebanese University Agreement
 Damascus University Agreement
 Al Zaytouna University Agreement
 Arab Center for Nutrition Agreement
 Ain Shams University Agreement
 INPT Morocco Agreement
 Rafic Hariri University Hospital Agreement
 AL SAHEL Hospital Agreement
 AL SAHEL Hospital Agreement
 ETAG/EOQ Initiative
 Oracle Academy

References

External links
 http://www.gu.edu.lb/
 https://web.archive.org/web/20110813194907/http://www.gu.edu.lb/GU_Ar_News/

Educational institutions established in 1992
Universities in Lebanon
1992 establishments in Lebanon